Entre violence et violon is a 1983 album of the French singer Johnny Hallyday album. The same year, it achieved Gold status for over 100,000 units sold.

Track listing
Entre violence et violon 4:56
Les scellés sur ma vie 3:40
Laisse-moi une chance 4:51
Marie Marie 3:17
Pour ceux qui s'aime 2:30
L'amour violent 3:23
Quand un homme devient fou 6:17
Mes souvenirs, mes seize ans 4:16
La fille d'en face 4:54
Signes extérieurs de richesse 4:47
Source: Entre Violence et Violon track listing

References

1983 albums
Johnny Hallyday albums